Villages at Roll Hill (formerly called Fay Apartments) is a small neighborhood in Cincinnati, Ohio. A federal study showed that 88.6% of the neighborhood's housing was subsidized in 2008. The population was 1,918 at the 2020 census.

In an effort to revive the blighted neighborhood, these apartments have undergone a $36 million renovation and been renamed The Villages at Roll Hill. As of 2015, the City of Cincinnati refers to this neighborhood as the Villages at Roll Hill.

References 

Neighborhoods in Cincinnati